Setter Capital is a Canadian independent investment bank primarily focused on the private equity secondary market, providing fund acquisition, non-strategic asset disposal, investor liquidity management and optimization and market validation advisory services between some of the world’s largest institutional investors.

Setter Capital acts as a sell-side advisor and as an advisor to buyers and “covers over 7,000 institutional investors in alternative investment funds, over 800 buyers of funds, more than 2,000 opportunistic sellers, and their buy and sell interest in more than 3,000 fund families.” Since inception, Setter Capital has completed over $25 billion in successful secondary transactions.

Regulation
Setter Capital Inc. is a broker-dealer licensed by the Financial Industry Regulatory Authority (FINRA) and an exempt market dealer licensed by the Ontario Securities Commission and is a member of the Securities Investor Protection Corporation (SIPC).

Competitors
Within the secondary advisory space, other advisors also include investments banks (Credit Suisse and UBS), electronic exchanges (NYPPE also a buyer of secondary interests through Allen Capital Partners), dedicated secondary advisory firms such as Cogent Partners, as well as established fund placement agents such as (Campbell Lutyens, Park Hill Group and  Probitas Partners).

Setter Liquidity Rating 

In the course of monitoring secondary market activity, Setter has developed a unique measure of the relative liquidity of fund investments, termed the Setter Liquidity Rating whereby certain fund families receive a rating of ‘Good‘, ‘Very Good’, ‘Excellent’ or ‘Unrated’.
	
Generally, a ‘Good’ rating suggests that there are many potential buyers, (typically 20+) that are interested to bid on a fund within the fund family. ‘Very Good’ and ‘Excellent’ denote progressively stronger potential demand. ‘Unrated’ fund families are less targeted by buyers and/or have fewer buyers within their existing investor base or for which there is simply not enough data points because they rarely come up for sale.” 

This metric allows sellers to assess the saleability of their interests, buyers to understand the competitive landscape for their targeted funds and to assist primary investors in estimating the potential liquidity of new or existing investments. The Setter Liquidity Rating is available on SecondaryLink.com, a website dedicated to the secondary market for alternative investments.

References

Financial services companies established in 2006
Banks established in 2006
Stock brokerages and investment banks of Canada